Toon Leenders (born 17 April 1986) is a Dutch handball player for HSG Nordhorn-Lingen and the Dutch national team.

He represented the Netherlands at the 2020 European Men's Handball Championship.

References

External links

1986 births
Living people
Dutch male handball players
People from Deurne, Netherlands
Expatriate handball players
Dutch expatriate sportspeople in Germany
HSG Nordhorn-Lingen players
Handball-Bundesliga players
Sportspeople from North Brabant